Treasure Beach is the name given to a stretch of four Jamaican coves and their associated settlements: Billy's Bay, Frenchman's Bay, Calabash Bay and Great (Pedro) Bay.

The region is isolated from the main tourist areas and the minor roads connecting with the main highway at Black River or Santa Cruz tend to suffer damage in heavy rain, but are usually passable with care. There are a few small hotels and guest houses serving tourists seeking a very quiet seaside location.

History
The beach resort takes its name from "The Treasure Beach Hotel" opened by a Canadian man in the 1930s. It went on to become the name given to four bays in the surrounding area.

Fort Charles Bay
Fort Charles Bay is the first beach you get to from Black River. The beach is 18 km (11 miles) long and a great swimming beach.

Billy's Bay
Billy's Bay is 3 km (2 miles) east of Fort Charles Bay and is the second fishing beach and settlement reached when approaching Treasure Beach from Black River.

Frenchman's Bay

Frenchman's Bay is the second beach and settlement reached when approaching Treasure Beach from Black River.

There are a number of small, bustling restaurants.

Calabash Bay
From the Pedro Bluff heading west, it’s the second of the bays, after Great Bay, a quaint little fishing settlement with a population of about 3000.

Calabash bay is a 600m long beach has a narrow strip of brown sand mixed with magnetite (black sand). The swimming is good, but since the beach is open to the south, small breakers sometimes appear when it’s windy. Tourists seeking to escape the all-inclusive-shut-in-the-hotel experience find this area of the island most satisfying.

There are a few simple restaurants in the village.

The former Old Wharf Hotel housed a residential treatment facility named Tranquility Bay.

Great (Pedro) Bay
Great Pedro Bay is the most easterly of the settlements and beaches that make up Treasure Beach. The road ends here, regardless of where you are coming from.

See also

 List of beaches in Jamaica
 Perry Henzell

External links

Treasure Beach general
Aerial view.
Treasure Beach Community Web Site
Treasure Tours
http://www.jamaicaescapes.com
360 VIRTUAL TOUR IN HD
 Travel Articles around the world on Treasure BeachAccommodationTreasure Beach scene
 https://travel80.com/treasure-beach-jamaica/

Billy's Bay
Aerial view.
Photos:  .

Frenchman's Bay
Aerial view.
Photos:  .

Calabash Bay
Aerial view.
Photos:    .

Great Pedro Bay
Aerial view.
Photos:

References

Beaches of Jamaica
Geography of Saint Elizabeth Parish
Populated coastal places in Jamaica
Tourist attractions in Saint Elizabeth Parish
Populated places in Saint Elizabeth Parish